The 2019 St. Petersburg Ladies' Trophy was a professional tennis tournament played on indoor hard courts. It was the 10th edition of the tournament and fourth time as a WTA Premier tournament. It was part of the 2019 WTA Tour and was held between 28 January and 3 February 2019.

Point distribution

Prize money

1Qualifiers prize money is also the Round of 32 prize money.
*per team

Singles main draw entrants

Seeds

1 Rankings as of January 14, 2019.

Other entrants
The following players received wildcards into the singles main draw:
  Victoria Azarenka
  Olga Danilović
  Ekaterina Makarova
  Vera Zvonareva

The following player received entry using a protected ranking into the singles main draw:
  Timea Bacsinszky

The following players received entry from the qualifying draw:
  Ekaterina Alexandrova
  Ysaline Bonaventure
  Margarita Gasparyan 
  Tereza Martincová

The following players received entry as lucky losers:
  Katie Boulter
  Veronika Kudermetova

Withdrawals
Before the tournament
  Dominika Cibulková → replaced by  Katie Boulter
  Camila Giorgi → replaced by  Veronika Kudermetova
  Aliaksandra Sasnovich → replaced by  Kirsten Flipkens
  Carla Suárez Navarro → replaced by  Alison Van Uytvanck
During the tournament
  Maria Sharapova (right shoulder injury)

Doubles main draw entrants

Seeds

1 Rankings as of January 14, 2019.

Other entrants 
The following pair received a wildcard into the doubles main draw:
  Daria Mishina /  Ekaterina Shalimova

Champions

Singles

  Kiki Bertens def.  Donna Vekić, 7–6(7–2), 6–4

Doubles

  Margarita Gasparyan /  Ekaterina Makarova def.  Anna Kalinskaya /  Viktória Kužmová, 7–5, 7–5

References

External links
 Official website

St. Petersburg Ladies' Trophy
St. Petersburg Ladies Trophy
2019 in Russian women's sport
St. Petersburg
St. Petersburg
2019 in Russian tennis